Prespa Glacier on Rozhen Peninsula, Livingston Island in the South Shetland Islands, Antarctica is situated east-northeast of Tarnovo Ice Piedmont, east of the head of Charity Glacier, southeast of Ruen Icefall and southwest of Macy Glacier. It is bounded to the east by Needle Peak and Ludogorie Peak, to the northwest by St. Cyril Peak and St. Methodius Peak, and to the southwest by Shumen Peak and Yambol Peak, and flows southeastward into Bransfield Strait between Gela Point and Samuel Point.  The feature extends 3.5 km in east-west direction and 2.5 km in north-south direction.  The glacier is named after Prespa Peak in the Rhodope Mountains, Bulgaria.

Location

See also
 List of glaciers in the Antarctic
 Glaciology

Maps
 South Shetland Islands. Scale 1:200000 topographic map. DOS 610 Sheet W 62 60. Tolworth, UK, 1968.
 Islas Livingston y Decepción.  Mapa topográfico a escala 1:100000.  Madrid: Servicio Geográfico del Ejército, 1991.
 S. Soccol, D. Gildea and J. Bath. Livingston Island, Antarctica. Scale 1:100000 satellite map. The Omega Foundation, USA, 2004.
 L.L. Ivanov et al., Antarctica: Livingston Island and Greenwich Island, South Shetland Islands (from English Strait to Morton Strait, with illustrations and ice-cover distribution), 1:100000 scale topographic map, Antarctic Place-names Commission of Bulgaria, Sofia, 2005
 L.L. Ivanov. Antarctica: Livingston Island and Greenwich, Robert, Snow and Smith Islands. Scale 1:120000 topographic map. Troyan: Manfred Wörner Foundation, 2010.  (First edition 2009. )
 Antarctic Digital Database (ADD). Scale 1:250000 topographic map of Antarctica. Scientific Committee on Antarctic Research (SCAR), 1993–2016.

References
 Bulgarian Antarctic Gazetteer. Antarctic Place-names Commission. (details in Bulgarian, basic data in English)
 Prespa Glacier SCAR Composite Antarctic Gazetteer

External links
 Prespa Glacier. Copernix satellite image

Glaciers of Livingston Island